Botswana Television (also known as BTV and Botswana TV) is the national broadcaster in Botswana. Botswana's first national television service started in 2000 following a 1997 government decision. The station delivers thirteen hours of local and international programmes daily on weekdays and 13 hours of programming on weekends.

Programming
Botswana Television usually offers local content during its run. Shows like Pula Power, Flava Dome and Mokaragana aim to entertain Batswana nationwide through popular music. The TV drama, Pelokgale encourages Batswana to stop Gender Based Violence. News is also broadcast daily.

History
It was launched on 31 July 2000, BTV has established itself in Botswana's viewing habits.

The children's programme "Mantlwaneng" was a leading part of a fledgling BTV when it launched. Its child stars, Marang Molosiwa, Rea Kopi, Phenyo Mogampane and StaXx have gone onto careers based on this early experience.

Botswana Television started its new offer of channels on October 2, 2022. The change coincided with the switch-off of analogue terrestrial signals in the country. The new channels are BTV 1 (entertainment), BTV 2 (education) and BTV News.

Approach
The station aims to provide at least 60% local content to meet the diverse needs of Botswana. It seeks to align its strategy with the national vision, Vision 2016. The majority of Batswana are young people and Botswana has diverse cultural and language groups.

BTV is the first station in Africa and the second in the world after ITN (UK-based Independent Television News) to fully use digital technology. Its signal is carried on the Intelsat 20  satellite with a significant footprint, which covers the whole country, and most of the Southern African Development Community (SADC) region. The station is fully Serial Digital Video, 4:3 and 16:9 switchable, but with the flexibility of analogue with dual language stereo capabilities.

The station uses the Quantel Inspiration System for processing and transmission with the news processing software ENPS (Electronic News Production System) in the newsroom. Its server-based technology gives the news the speed and flexibility sought by journalists and news editors.

To cover the wide area of the country, two satellite News Gathering (SNG) teams are based in the North and North-West - Francistown and Maun respectively. Their area of responsibility stretches from Palapye/Serowe to the border with Zimbabwe and Zambia. The Maun team also covers Ghanzi the extreme West.

The station already provides a great outlet for advertisers because of its coverage. The client base has been gradually increasing since launch. With SADC secretariat based in Gaborone, BTV is expected to play a significant role in driving Botswana's vision of becoming the financial services centre for the region and attracting investors to Botswana. As it grows, the station expects to play a crucial role in the development of the television industry in Botswana.

ISDB-T / SBTVD
Features:

 Supports ISDB-T broadcast (13 segments).
 MPEG-2/ MPEG-4 AVC/ H.264 HD/ SD video.
 DiVX Compatible with 480i/ 480p/ 720p/ 1080i/ 1080p video formats. Auto and Manually scan all available TV and radio channels. 
 Aspect ratio 16:9 and 4:3.
 1000 channels memory. 
 Parental control. 
 Teletext/ Bit map subtitle. 
 Compliant with ETS1.
 Supported 7 days EPG function. 
 VBI Teletext support 6 MHz software setting Auto/ Manual program search. 
 Multi language supported.

See also
 Botswana
 Internet in Botswana
 Botswana Internet Exchange
 Telecommunications in Botswana
 Botswana Telecommunications Authority

References

Publicly funded broadcasters
Television in Botswana
State media
Broadcasting companies of Botswana
Television channels and stations established in 2000